Carol Johnson  is an Emerita professor at the Department of Politics and International Relations at the University of Adelaide, known for her work on Australian politics and her new book Social Democracy and the Crisis of Equality: Australian Social Democracy in a Changing World. She has also done research into sexuality, gender and feminism.

She is active on the website The Conversation, writing articles on Australian politics, critically examining the political environment of the country.

Career 
Her early work includes publications about the Labour government in Australian politics. Johnson was president of the Australian Political Studies Association briefly from 1998-1999.

Since 2000, Johnson's work has been focussed on Australian politics, but it also includes research into the lesbian and gay movement. She also edited The Social Sciences in the Asian Century, investigating the "on the challenges of practising the social sciences in the Asia-Pacific region in the twenty-first century".

Johnson was elected Fellow of the Academy of Social Sciences in Australia in 2005 and served as a member of its executive committee for two years from 2012 until 2014.

In 2019, Johnson won the Lifetime Achievement Award from the Australian Political Studies Association.

References

Living people
Year of birth missing (living people)
Australian political scientists
Australian journalists
Fellows of the Academy of the Social Sciences in Australia
Women political scientists